Coëtivy Island is a small coral island in the Seychelles  south of Mahé, at .

History
It was named after Chevalier de Coëtivy, commander of the Ile de France who first sighted the island in 1771. 
In 1908 it was transferred from Mauritius to Seychelles.
In 1970 the island was purchased by the parastatal Seychelles Marketing Board (SMB).
In 1989, SMB began producing shrimp. Coëtivy Island became famous for its shrimp farms (black tiger prawn) and shrimp processing plant that operated on the island. Large scale production began on August 1992. However, in 2008, due to hard financial times, the plant closed.
in 2009, the island became the site of an active prison (Ministry of Internal Affairs choice) for low security prisoners and a rehabilitation center for drug abusers. Visitation is strictly controlled and access is only possible by private airplane charter.
By 2020, the Prison should be increased to capacity of 600 inmates.
By 2020, the island is expected to have more residential apartments.

Geography

Demographics
The island has a population of 260.

Economy
The islanders are mostly farmers. They produce vegetables which are sold in markets on Mahé.
The main production activities on the island include farming, livestock, charcoal production, salted fish production and coconut processing which include production of copra, pounac and coconut oil.

Administration
The island belongs to Outer Islands District. 
Being an island with a small population, there are not any government buildings or services. For many services, people have to go to Victoria, which is a difficult task.

Transport
The island is bisected by a  airfield that follows the long east–west axis. The island is occasionally serviced by an Island Development Company (IDC) aircraft from Mahé.

Economics
The inhabitants on the island are engaged in very small scale farming and fishing which are mainly for the island consumption.

Flora and fauna
The island is known for its rich fish life.

Image gallery

References

External links 

 Island guide 1
 Island guide 2
 National Bureau of Statistics
 Info on the island

Islands of Outer Islands (Seychelles)
Coral islands